Jul is a traditional Korean greeting and is oftentimes accompanied by a handshake. Use both hands when handshaking (right arm performing the handshake should be supported by the left arm). Koreans prefer to do business with people who they already know so if it's possible, try to have a third party to originate the business. Do not introduce yourself and wait until the third party introduces you. In South Korea, it is a common practice to share gifts at the first meeting. It is intended to build relationships and acquire favors. Gift is part of the business culture and it is not considered bribery. When giving or receiving gifts, make sure to use both hands since using one hand is considered rude. However, do not give an expensive gift because gifts are reciprocated. Also present the gift in a modest fashion.

Greetings
Korean culture